Duruçay is a village in the Kastamonu District district of Kastamonu Province, Turkey. Its population is 271 (2021).

See also
Halime Çavuş

References

Villages in Kastamonu District